Bohli is a surname. Notable people with the surname include:

 Raïs M'Bolhi (born 1986), Algerian football player
 Stéphane Bohli (born 1983), Swiss tennis player
 Tom Bohli (born 1994), Swiss cyclist

See also
 Bohlin
 Boli (disambiguation)